Te Motu Kairangi / Miramar Peninsula is a large peninsula on the southeastern side of the city of Wellington, New Zealand. It is located at the entrance to Wellington Harbour, in Wellington's eastern suburbs. According to Māori legend, it was formed when the taniwha Whaitaitai beached as he tried to escape the confines of the harbour. It contains the suburb of Miramar.

Situation
 
From above, the peninsula resembles the shape of a shark. Northwards, it juts into Wellington Harbour (formerly known as Port Nicholson, and in Māori as Te Whanganui-a-Tara, the Great Harbour of Tara). To the south are Cook Strait and the South Pacific Ocean. The suburbs of Kilbirnie, Lyall Bay, Hataitai and Newtown, and the inner city, lie to the west. To the east a narrow stretch of water connects Wellington Harbour with Cook Strait and the open sea; beyond this channel are the scrubby Eastbourne hills, and the high and forested Ōrongorongo Ranges. From the peninsula's high points, an observer can look north to the Hutt Valley and the Tararua Ranges, or southwest across Cook Strait, to the high peaks of the Inland and Seaward Kaikoura Ranges, which are often snowbound in winter.

Physical description of the peninsula
The coastline is rocky, with many coves, steep cliffs, and small pinnacles and caves, but there are also sweeping and sandy beaches, notably at Breaker Bay, Worser Bay, Scorching Bay, Moa Point and Tarakena Bay. A high ridge running on an approximate north/south axis forms the spine of the peninsula, with high points Mount Crawford in the north and Beacon Hill in the south. The peninsula has a large area of low-lying land, the Miramar flats, and a smaller area of flat land at Seatoun, both of which are mainly covered in residential housing.

The peninsula is largely urbanized, with large suburbs of Miramar, Maupuia, Strathmore and Seatoun, and narrow strips of houses along the coast at Breaker Bay, Karaka Bay and Moa Point. The urban area is a mix of suburban housing, retail outlets, schools, light and service industries, recreation grounds (such as a golf course and sports fields), and Wellington Airport. There are also extensive areas of regenerating native bush, pine forest, and remnant farmland, as well as urban gardens. A narrow two-lane road circles the peninsula, providing a picturesque route around the many bays, coves and headlands.

At the entrance to Wellington Harbour, the rocks of Barrett Reef lie close to the shore of the peninsula. On 10 April 1968 , an inter-island ferry, foundered on Barrett Reef and later capsized near Steeple Rock, a pinnacle just off Seatoun. 53 people were killed.

Weather
The peninsula is exposed to Wellington's prevailing northwest wind and the southerly wind. During southerly storms, big waves and swells batter the peninsula's rocky southern shore. The peninsula's topography, with its high ridges and small bays and coves, provides shelter from the wind in many places. On 15 August 2011, during a prolonged southerly storm, snow fell across the peninsula in the late morning, settling in light drifts on trees, streets and fields. Like other parts of Wellington, snowfall at sea level is a very rare occurrence.

Notable landmarks
Notable landmarks include:

 Wellington International Airport Its runway runs north-south along the western side, separating Miramar from Rongotai, Lyall Bay and Kilbirnie. A tunnel for pedestrians and cyclists runs on a west/east axis beneath the runway, from Miro Street in Miramar to Coutts Street in Rongotai.
 
 Massey Memorial The marble mausoleum of Prime Minister William Massey (1856 - 1925) sits on a headland at Point Halswell, at the northern tip of the peninsula. It can be accessed from Massey Road, along a short walking track.

 Atatürk Memorial A plinth on a cliff overlooking Tarakena Bay and Cook Strait commemorates Mustafa Kemal Atatürk, founder of the Republic of Turkey, statesman and general, who led Turkish troops in action against New Zealand soldiers at Gallipoli in the First World War.

 Rangitatau and Poito Site of a Māori kainga (village) and pa in bush above Tarakena Bay, near the Atatürk Memorial. In pre-European times, people of the Ngai Tara and Ngati Ira iwi lived here, using the site for fishing in Cook Strait. In 1819-20, Nga Puhi and Ngati Toa raiders attacked and sacked the pa, and killed, enslaved or drove off its inhabitants.

 Eastern Walkway A walking track that traverses the main ridge from the Pass of Branda to Tarakena Bay. It runs for 2.5 km, passing mainly through regenerating native forest, and provides excellent views of Wellington city, the Miramar Peninsula, Wellington Harbour and Cook Strait.

 The CuttingThe Cutting was constructed through a low ridge on the peninsula's eastern side in the late 1890s, and widened in 1910. It provides a thoroughfare from Cobham Drive to Miramar Avenue and central Miramar.

 Wellington Blown Away sign A sign on a hill near the Miramar Cutting spells out 'Wellington' with the last few letters looking like they are blowing away in Wellington's famous winds. Originally Wellington Airport announced it would install a sign saying 'Wellywood', referencing the area's film industry, but this proposal was not popular so a competition was created by the airport and promoted by the Dominion Post newspaper. The winner of the design competition was 'Wellington Blown Away', designed by Matt Sellars and Raymond McKay of Saatchi and Saatchi. The sign was installed in 2012, and is intended to be seen from the air when landing from the north at Wellington Airport.

 Shelly Bay buildings From 1885 to 1995, Shelly Bay was a naval and air force base, and many barracks, workshops, stores, wharves and slipways were built. Concrete munitions magazines are in pine forest above the bay. The area is now owned by local iwi, through the Port Nicholson Trust.

 Fort Ballance Fort Ballance was the premier fort in the Wellington area for 26 years (1885-1911). Used by the military over a period of 60 years (1885-1945), the 1880s layout of Fort Ballance is largely unaltered and a good impression of the original nineteenth century fort remains. The fort is a permanent reminder of the technology used in the coastal defence network of the 1880s and it is an early example of the use of concrete as a building material.

 Mt Crawford Prison Wellington Prison, commonly known as Mt Crawford Prison, was located at the top of Mt Crawford, a peak on the ridge of hills forming a spine at the north end of the Miramar peninsula. The prison was opened in 1927 to replace the Victorian-era Terrace Gaol and was fully occupied by 1929. The prison included a gallows and four men were hanged there, all in the 1930s. The prison closed in 2012. LINZ took over management of the  site, which is owned by the Defence Force and the Department of Corrections, but as of 2021 nothing had been done with it and the building remained derelict and the site a dumping ground for rubbish. In 2019 there was a proposal by Taranaki Whānui – the commercial arm of the Port Nicholson Block Settlement Trust – to build 300 homes on the site. However a group of Taranaki Whānui members known as Mau Whenua opposed the housing development, saying they believe the land is sacred. In 2021 preliminary geotechnical drilling investigation was done at the site.:

Transport links
Cobham Drive is the main road connecting Miramar with the rest of Wellington city. It runs around the north end of Wellington Airport, at Evans Bay. Buses run frequently between Miramar and the city, and the harbour ferry connects with places around Wellington Harbour: Queens Wharf, Days Bay, Petone, and Matiu/Somes Island. A cycle path runs from Miramar to the central city, starting at Burnham Wharf and continuing along Cobham Drive, Evans Bay Parade and Oriental Parade.

Civic associations
The peninsula has several sports clubs: Miramar Rangers, a semi-professional football club, founded in 1907; Seatoun AFC, an amateur football club founded in 1909; and Oriental Rongotai Football Club ('Ories'), an amateur rugby club formed in 1888. The Eastern Suburbs Cricket Club, in nearby Kilbirnie, covers junior and senior cricketers on the peninsula.

Film industry
Film director Peter Jackson has based his film production empire in Miramar, with studios, sound stages, and pre- and post-production facilities. Weta Workshop, involved in many movies directed by Jackson, such as The Lord of the Rings film trilogy, King Kong, and The Hobbit, is also in Miramar.

History

The Māori name for the area when it was still an island was Te Motu Kairangi (meaning "esteemed" or "precious" island). The island was separated from the main island (Te Ika a Māui) by a sea channel called Te Awa-a-Taia (the channel of Taia); this was where Kilbirnie is now. The peninsula area later became known as Hataitai or Whataitai.

Kupe and Centuries of Tangata Whenua 

The island of Te Motu Kairangi was first settled as long ago as 950 AD when Kupe the explorer arrived.  Kupe first landed near Seatoun, and a large rock near the shore still bears the name Te Ure-o-Kupe (Kupe’s penis) or Te Aroaro-o-Kupe (Kupe’s presence). The area was home in turn to Ngai Tara, Rangitane, Ngati Kahungungu, Ngai Tahu, Mua Upoko, Ngāti Ira, and Te Ati Awa. Other iwi who may have dwelt here include Waitaha, Ngati Mamoe, Ngati Kuia, Ngati Kuru, and Ngati Mutunga.

Ngai Tara were the first to settle on the island, and built the first pā, named "Whetu Kairangi" (bountiful stars) on the hill overlooking Worser Bay. The name of Wellington Harbour "Whanganui-a-Tara" (harbour of Tara) was also named for Tara.

Ngai Tahu lived in the peninsula on their long multi-generation migration southwards. They occupied pa already built as well as building their own.

Around 1460 AD an earthquake named "Haowhenua" (earth swallower)  raised the land, eliminating the shallow channel and joining the island to the mainland. This created a flat plain and freshwater lake in the centre of the peninsula. The lake was first called "Te Rotokura" (red lagoon)  and later "Para".  When Pākehā settled they named this lagoon "Burnham Water".

With the water channel in the east gone following the earthquake more fortifications and defensive pa were needed. Many pā (a village, sometimes also a fortress) and kainga (homes/dwellings)  existed over many centuries with many changes, and include the following

 Kakariki-hutia Pa (built by Ngāti Ira) overlooking modern day Awa Road
 Kau-whakaara-waru on the east side of Point Halswell
 Mahanga (Te Mahanga Pa) near Kau Bay and above Mahanga Bay
 Manu-kai-kura, a kainga in the small bay north of Shelly Bay
 Mataki-kai-poinga on the western hill below Mount Crawford was originally built by Ngāti Kaitangata (a hapu of Ngati Ira) under their chief Tuahitiri and later occupied by Ngai Tahu under their chief TioTio
 Maupuia Pa, a stockaded village built by Ngāti Hinepare, a hapu of Ngāti Kahungnunu on the narrow part of Rongotai Ridge near the Wellington sign/Miramar cutting today
 Oruaiti Pa (the place of the small pit) built by Te Rerewa of Rangitane on the ridge at point Dorset
 Paewhenua, a kainga at Eve Bay west of Breaker Bay
 Poito Pa, a fortified village of Ngāti Ira near the Poti stream at Tarakena Bay (attacked and burned along with Rangitatau Pa in 1819-1820)
 Puhirangi Pa on the hill about the stream flowing into Scorching Bay on the ridge above Karaka Bay
 Rangitatau Pa was built by Ngai Tara. It was located above Seatoun and may have stretched as far as Pilot Hill and over to Lyall Bay. The principal whare of the pa was called "Raukawa" and a fishing rock offshore was called "Te Kai-whatawhata". Rangitatau was the largest pa on the peninsula and was inhabited over many centuries. It was often described as a "citadel" and was used by people living in nearby Poito village as a refuge during attacks. Both Poito and Rangitatau were destroyed by raiders in 1819-1820
 Tapu-te-Rangi pa is recorded on the map by McLeod and on plans by Crawford as being in Kilbirnie but this may be a mistake, as Tapu-te-Ranga is a name for the motu in island bay
 Te Whetu-kairangi, a kainga of Ngai Tara and Muaupoko was above Worser Bay
 Paekawakawa Kainga is mentioned on McLeod's map but is believed by later historians to be mistaken for a place of the same name in Island Bay.

Pakeha Arrival 
Captain Cook anchored off the coast near Miramar on his first visit to Aotearoa, and mapped much of the coastline but didn't record the harbour entrance. On his second voyage to Aotearoa he noted the entrance to Whanganui-a-Tara, and attempted unsuccessfully to enter the harbour. His diary entry reads:November 2, 1773. We discovered on the east side of Cape Teerawhitte a new inlet I had never observed before. Being tired with beating against the N.W. winds, I resolved to put into this place, if I found it practicable, or to anchor in the bay which lies before it ……… At one o'clock we reached the entrance of the inlet, just as the tide of ebb was making out; the wind likewise against us, we anchored in twelve fathoms water, the bottom a fine sand. The easternmost of the Black Rocks, which lie on the larboard side of the entrance of the inlet, bore N. by E. one mile distant; Cape Teerawhitte, or the west point of the bay, west, distant about two leagues; and the east point of the bay N. by E. four or five miles.

Soon after we had anchored, several of the natives came off in their canoes; two from one shore, and one from the other. It required but little address to get three or four of them on board. These people were extravagantly fond of nails above every other thing. To one man I gave two cocks and two hens, which he received with so much indifference as gave me little hopes he would take proper care of them.

We had not been at anchor here above two hours, before the wind veered to N.E., with which we weighed, but the anchor was hardly at the bows before it shifted to south. With this we could but just lead out of the bay.

Musket wars and the Fall of Rangitatau 
The citadel of Rangitatu was sacked and destroyed in late 1819-1820. The attack was led by Tuwhare the Toa. The first people killed at the pa were working in nearby kumara fields. They included: Te Urahi and Puahu of Ngati Rangi, Te Wawapo of Ngati Ira, Takatua of Ngati Rakai, and a number of others, including Pauata, Kopani, Te Rongarua, Puakato, Hungahunga, Koroua and Huatoki, all men. Women slain were Huirua, Te Arahe, Pukurua, Te Koki, Te Rehu, Tangiaru, Hineuhi and Tihitihi. In all some 50 died.

Henry Maynard Christie recorded in 1899 that the burned totara palisades were still in the ground.

The land of Miramar was held by Te Āti Awa 20 years later when the Treaty of Waitangi was signed in 1840.

Farming 
James Coutts Crawford arrived in Wellington in 1839 and purchased five land orders from The New Zealand Company. for 1,300 guineas, which included five acres of town land and 5,000 acres of country land, thus he acquired the Miramar peninsula which was then known as "Watt's Peninsula". Crawford established his cattle farm at the north end of the lake and named it "Glendavar".  Crawford wrote in 1840 that the hills were "chiefly clothed with the common fern mixed with flax" and:the  flat may be said to have been chiefly occupied by water spread over about 200 acres of central area, and the water from it extended up the large swamps both to the north and south, lying, in general, nearly flush with the surface of the swamps.Henry Maynard Christie documented two farms on the peninsula by 1847 which he called "Glandavar" and "Tetcott". Glandavar was in the north end close under the hills. Tetcott was owned by Francis Molesworth and was in the south east corner of the plain. Christie also mentions that Māori brought eels from Heretaunga (Hutt River) and kept them in the lake as a store.

The Rotokua/Burnham Waters lake was drained by James Coutts Crawford in via a drainage tunnel built in 1847 (and widened in 1859) which was apparently New Zealand's first tunnel. This tunnel through Rongotai ridge is still there north of the 'Wellington' sign on Shelly Bay Road.

James Coutts Crawford named his house "Miramar" which is Spanish for "sea view". When the farmland was purchased by the City Council in 1901 to be sold for housing, the land was named as "Miramar Estate" which lead to the suburb retaining the name "Miramar".

New Zealand's first permanent racecourse was created in 1847 in Miramar:  The Wellington Independent published the announcement of the new race course on 2 October 1847 as: "The undersigned, having made arrangement with the proprietor of the land situated between Burnham Water, and Lyall's Bay, for the formation of a Race Course".

In the 1880s the "Russian Scare" was gripping the nation, with people fearing an invasion by Russia. New Zealand embarked on building fortifications to defend itself from attack by sea. In an era when naval power was based mainly on battleships, Miramar Peninsula's strategic position made it ideal for coastal guns to prevent enemy warships from entering Wellington Harbour. Large coastal artillery fortifications were built at Fort Ballance in 1885, and at Fort Dorset from 1908

Miramar Borough 
In the first years of the 20th century Miramar was still within "Hutt County" (which encompassed the whole Wellington region south of the Waikanae river, excluding Wellington City). The rates levied by the county in 1902 rose from ¼d per £1 of the property's value up to a new rate of 1d per £1 of value.  Very little had been spent in Miramar by the country for the previous decade, and locals expressed their anger at the increased rates, resulting in a reduction back to ¾d per £1.  A local resident (Mr C.J. Crawford) contested this in the Supreme Court winning a ruling that "the rate charged must be in accordance with service rendered in each Riding". The anger continued when the Hutt County Council threatened to appeal to the Privy Council. A petition was collected among Miramar residents and presented to the Governor and on 10 November 1904 the Seatoun Road Board District was constituted as a Borough, and proclaimed in the New Zealand Gazette. Mr C.J. Crawford was subsequently elected the first Mayor of Miramar Borough Council. Miramar was not yet linked to Wellington city by road. There were three ferries from Miramar, Karaka Bay and Seatoun wharves. Some early accounts mention a land approach by "rough bullock track" over Constable Street hill over the sand isthmus. Miramar plain was entirely surrounded by hills at this time. Miramar Borough amalgamated with Wellington City on 31 January 1921.

1900s 
Miramar Gas Works open in 1907(closed 1972) 

Shelly bay Naval base opened in 1907 and expanded in World War Two when ownership was transferred from the navy to the newly formed Air force, and expanded to include wharves for Sea Planes.

1910s 
Wonderland amusement park opened in Miramar in 1907. It included a Japanese Tea-House, distorting mirrors, a helter-skelter and an artificial lake. The park ran into financial troubles in 1910 and was sold to new owners, then shut permanently in 1912.  A Brick factory operated on the eastern hills from 1919 to 1968. All that remains now is a brick wall lining Ira street. The streets of Miramar plain were lined with red bricks as curbing. Some still remains in south Miramar streets.

1920s 
Miramar Borough amalgamated with Wellington City on 31 January 1921.

Rongotai aerodrome opened in 1929. This was in approximately the same location as Burger King Miramar is today.

1930s 
New Zealand's first state house was built at 7 fife lane Miramar.  Prime Minister Michael Joseph Savage and several Cabinet ministers helped to carry in the furniture of Wellington bus conductor David McGregor and his wife Mary on 18 September 1937.

1940s 
In the 1940s and the Second World War the peninsula was still an important component of an evolving coastal defence system, designed to protect the capital, harbour and hinterland from naval attack. . A look out post was built at Palmer Head in 1938. In the Second World War, the advent of naval air power made these coastal fortifications largely redundant, because an enemy could carry out aerial attacks, using planes launched from aircraft carriers well beyond the range of even the largest shore-based guns.

1950s 
The hill to the west of the Miramar plain was flattened in the 1950s and used to reclaim land from the sea to form the new airport runway. The residential street of Rongotai Tce ran along the hill ridge and was completely removed and all houses demolished. Over the years since the airport was built the suburb names have drifted location. The houses in south west Miramar from the gasometer to the golf course were in Rongotai but the name has now drifted south west towards Rongotai College. Likewise a shore point named "Moa point" was subsumed into the southern end of the runway resulting in the name now only being used by to describe remaining houses to the east.

Wellington Airport in its current location was opened on 24 October 1959, replacing Rongotai Aerodrome.

References

Wellington City
Peninsulas of New Zealand
Landforms of the Wellington Region
Wellington Harbour